Jonathan 'Jonty' Peter Strachan (born 9 September 1987) is a South African-born English former first-class cricketer.

Strachan was born at Cape Town in September 1987. He was educated in England at Dean Close School, before going up to The Queen's College, Oxford. While studying at Oxford, Strachan made two appearances in first-class cricket for Oxford University against Cambridge University in The University Matches of 2008 and 2009. In addition to playing for Oxford University, Strachan also made a single first-class appearance for Oxford UCCE against Nottinghamshire at Oxford in 2009. A right-arm medium-fast bowler, he took 4 wickets in his three first-class matches.

Strachan is currently employed by Soletanche Freyssinet, where he is the director of mergers and acquisitions.

Notes and references

External links

1987 births
Living people
Cricketers from Cape Town
South African emigrants to the United Kingdom
People educated at Dean Close School
Alumni of The Queen's College, Oxford
English cricketers
Oxford University cricketers
Oxford MCCU cricketers